Highlands High School is a public high school located in San Antonio, Texas (USA) and classified as a 5A school by the UIL. This school is one of twelve high schools in the San Antonio Independent School District. In 2015, the school was rated "Met Standard" by the Texas Education Agency.

Principals

 2017–Present Julio Garcia
 2016-2017 Luz Martinez
 2014-2016 Derrick Cade
 2006-2014 Lorna Klokkenga
 2001-2006 Lisa Conteras
 ????-2001 William E. Grindle
 1965–1972 Herman Vetter

Athletics
The Highlands Owls compete in the following sports:

Baseball
Basketball
Cross Country
Football
Golf
Soccer
Softball
Swimming and Diving
Tennis
Track and Field
Volleyball
Wrestling
Lacrosse

References

External links
 Official website

High schools in San Antonio
San Antonio Independent School District high schools